Identity may refer to:  

  
 Identity document
 Identity (philosophy)
 Identity (social science)
 Identity (mathematics)

Arts and entertainment

Film and television
 Identity (1987 film), an Iranian film
 Identity (2003 film), an American slasher film
 Identity (game show), an American game show
 Identity (TV series), a British police procedural drama television series
 "Identity" (Arrow), a 2013 episode 
 "Identity" (Burn Notice), a 2007 episode
 "Identity" (Charlie Jade), a 2005 episode 
 "Identity" (Legend of the Seeker), a 2008 episode
 "Identity" (Law & Order: Special Victims Unit episode), 2005
 "Identity" (NCIS: Los Angeles), a 2009 pilot episode

Music

Albums 
 Identity (3T album), 2004
 Identity (BoA album), 2010
 Identity (Far East Movement album), 2016
 Identity (Robert Pierre album), 2008
 Identity (Raghav album), 2008
 Identity (Victon EP), 2017
 Identity (Zee album), 1984

Songs 
 "Identity" (Sakanaction song), 2010
 "Identity" (X-Ray Spex song), 1978
 "Identity", a 1983 song by Bucks Fizz, B-side to "London Town"

Other uses in music
 Identity (music), in post-tonal music theory
 Identity (tuning), an odd member below and including a limit

Publications
 Identity, a defunct quarterly Australian magazine published by the Aboriginal Publications Foundation (1971–1982)
 Identity (novel), by Milan Kundera, 1998

Business 
 Accounting identity, calculation that must be true regardless of its variables
 Brand identity, the expression of a brand
 Corporate identity, the manner a corporation presents itself to the public

Philosophy and social science
 Identity (philosophy), the relation each thing bears only to itself
 Law of identity, that each thing is identical with itself
 Personal identity, the numerical identity of a person over time
 Identity (social science), qualities etc that characterize a person or group

Science 
 Digital identity, information used by computer systems to represent an external agent
 Identity (object-oriented programming), the property of objects that distinguishes them from other objects
 Identity (mathematics), an equality that holds regardless of the values of its variables
 Identity element, an element of the set which leaves unchanged every element when the operation is applied
 Identity function, a function that leaves its argument unchanged
 Identity matrix, with ones on the main diagonal, zeros elsewhere

Other uses
 Identity document, or ID

See also 

 Biometrics
 Collective identity
 Cultural diversity
 Cultural identity
 Entity (disambiguation)
 ID (disambiguation)
 Identification (disambiguation)
 Identifier, a name that identifies a unique object or class of objects
 Identity politics
 National identity
 Outline of self
 Personal data
 Personal identity (disambiguation)
 Secret identity (disambiguation)
 The Bourne Identity (disambiguation)